Yorgelis Rodríguez García (born 25 January 1995) is a Cuban track and field athlete specialising in the heptathlon. She represented her country at the 2013 World Championships finishing twelfth overall. Earlier she won several medals at the World Junior and Youth Championships, including the gold at the 2012 World Junior Championships.

She was the gold medalist at the 2015 Pan American Games. She competed at the 2020 Summer Olympics.

Competition record
{| 
|-
!colspan="6"|Representing 
|-
|2011
|World Youth Championships
|Lille, France
|bgcolor=silver|2nd
|Heptathlon (youth)
|5671 pts
|-
|rowspan=2|2012
|Pan American Combined Events Cup
|Ottawa, Ontario, Canada
|bgcolor=gold|1st
|Heptathlon
|5819 pts
|-
|World Junior Championships
|Barcelona, Spain
|bgcolor=gold|1st
|Heptathlon
|5966 pts
|-
|rowspan=2|2013
|Pan American Combined Events Cup
|Ottawa, Ontario, Canada
|bgcolor=gold|1st
|Heptathlon
|5947 pts
|-
|World Championships
|Moscow, Russia
|12th
|Heptathlon
|6148 pts
|-
|rowspan=3|2014
|rowspan=2|World Junior Championships
|rowspan=2|Eugene, United States
|16th (q)
|High jump
|1.79 m
|-
|bgcolor=silver|2nd
|Heptathlon
|6006 pts
|-
|Central American and Caribbean Games
|Veracruz, Mexico
|bgcolor=gold|1st
|Heptathlon
|5984 pts
|-
|rowspan=3|2015
|Pan American Combined Events Cup
|Ottawa, Canada
|bgcolor=gold|1st
|Heptathlon
|6068 pts
|-
|Pan American Games
|Toronto, Canada
|bgcolor=gold|1st
|Heptathlon
|6332 pts
|-
|World Championships
|Beijing, China
|21st
|Heptathlon
|5932 pts
|-
|2016
|Olympic Games
|Rio de Janeiro, Brazil
|7th
|Heptathlon
|6452 pts
|-
|2017
|World Championships
|London, United Kingdom
|4th
|Heptathlon
|6594 pts NR
|-
|rowspan=3|2018
|rowspan=2|World Indoor Championships
|rowspan=2|Birmingham, United Kingdom
|13th
|High jump
|1.84 m
|-
|bgcolor=cc9966|3rd
|Pentathlon
|4637 pts
|-
|Central American and Caribbean Games
|Barranquilla, Colombia
|bgcolor=gold|1st
|Heptathlon
|6436 pts
|-
|2019
|Pan American Games
|Lima, Peru
| –
|Heptathlon
|DNF
|-
|2021
|Olympic Games
|Tokyo, Japan
| –
|Heptathlon
|DNF
|}

Personal bestsOutdoor200 metres – 23.96 (-0.6 m/s) (Götzis 2018)
800 metres – 2:10.48 (London 2017)
100 metres hurdles – 13.48 (+0.3 m/s) (Götzis 2018)
High jump – 1.95 (London 2017)
Long jump – 6.50 (+1.4 m/s) (Bilbao 2017)
Shot put – 14.95 (Götzis 2018)
Javelin throw – 49.56 (Götzis 2021)
Heptathlon – 6742 NR (Götzis 2018)Indoor800 metres – 2:17.70 (Birmingham 2018)
60 metres hurdles – 8.57 (Birmingham 2018)
High jump – 1.88 (Birmingham 2018)
Long jump – 6.29 (Sabadell 2018)
Shot put – 14.15 (Birmingham 2018)
Pentathlon – 4637 NR''' (Birmingham 2018)

References

External links

1995 births
Living people
Sportspeople from Guantánamo
Cuban heptathletes
Cuban female high jumpers
Pan American Games gold medalists for Cuba
Pan American Games medalists in athletics (track and field)
Athletes (track and field) at the 2015 Pan American Games
Athletes (track and field) at the 2019 Pan American Games
World Athletics Championships athletes for Cuba
Athletes (track and field) at the 2016 Summer Olympics
Olympic athletes of Cuba
Central American and Caribbean Games gold medalists for Cuba
Competitors at the 2014 Central American and Caribbean Games
Competitors at the 2018 Central American and Caribbean Games
Central American and Caribbean Games medalists in athletics
Medalists at the 2015 Pan American Games
Athletes (track and field) at the 2020 Summer Olympics
21st-century Cuban women